Steven C. Panagiotakos is a former Democratic Massachusetts state senator, and was the chairperson of the Senate Ways and Means Committee.

Early years
Panagiotakos was born on November 26, 1959, in Alexandria, Virginia.

Education
Panagiotakos attended high school at Phillips Academy, Andover, in Andover, Massachusetts, graduating in 1978.

Panagiotakos then went to Harvard University graduating with his Bachelor of Arts in 1982, and then went on to Suffolk University Law School, for his Juris Doctor, graduating in 1989.

Public office
1990–1993: Lowell School Committee
1993–1996: Massachusetts House of Representatives
1997–2011: Massachusetts Senate
 On March 29, 2010, a Boston Globe article confirmed that Panagiotakos will not seek re-election.

Professional career
Panagiotakos has been an attorney since 1991, with his own law firm "Law Offices of Steven C. Panagiotakos."  and is a member of the Association of Trial Lawyers of America and the Massachusetts Bar Association.

Other interests
Panagiotakos, among other charitable involvements is an Honorary board member of the Big Brothers Big Sisters of Greater Lowell and the Nashoba Valley, as well as Member of the Greater Lowell Alzheimer's Association.

References

External links
Massachusetts Senate website

Living people
1959 births
Democratic Party Massachusetts state senators
Democratic Party members of the Massachusetts House of Representatives
Phillips Academy alumni
Harvard University alumni
Suffolk University Law School alumni